The 1998–99 season was Juventus Football Club's 101st in existence and 97th consecutive season in the top flight of Italian football.

Season summary
Juventus endured their worst domestic season since 1990–91, with superstar Alessandro Del Piero picking up a serious knee injury in the final minutes of a 2–2 draw with Udinese on 8 November 1998. France's World Cup hero Zinedine Zidane was similarly plagued by injury. Having won the World Cup with France the previous July, Zidane promptly picked up a knee injury and further injured himself in November. 

Unlike the preceding four seasons, under the guidance of Marcello Lippi, Juventus' attack malfunctioned. In December 1998, Lippi announced his intention to depart the following June to manage Inter. In February Lippi was let go by the club, with successful former Parma coach Carlo Ancelotti taking over.

With Ancelotti at the helm, Juve managed to salvage a little respectability by reaching the semi-finals of the Champions League, drawing the first-leg 1-1 at Old Trafford. Following the first-leg, playmaker Zidane limped off at half-time in Juve's home draw against Bologna on 12 April 1999. Eventual champions Manchester United then defeated Juventus 3-2 at Stadio delle Alpi in the second-leg of the semi-final.

Following that Champions League semi-final defeat, Juve's season ended poorly by their high standards, finishing a lowly seventh in Serie A. Juve had to settle for the relative ignominy of the UEFA Cup the next season.

Players

Squad information

Transfers

Summer

Winter

Competitions

Supercoppa Italiana

Serie A

League table

Results summary

Results by round

Matches

UEFA Cup qualification

Top Scorers
  Filippo Inzaghi 13
  Daniel Fonseca 6
  Antonio Conte 4
  Thierry Henry 3
  Nicola Amoruso 3
  Zinedine Zidane 2
  Alessandro Del Piero 2

Coppa Italia

Second round

Round of 16

Quarter-finals

UEFA Champions League

Group stage

Knockout phase

Quarter-finals

Semi-finals

Statistics

Players statistics

References

Juventus F.C. seasons
Juventus